In two-stroke engine technology a Port-map is a diagram which shows the ports that are cut into the cylinder of an engine.

A port-map can be useful to determine opening/closing-timing and the area of specific ports.
These diagrams are usually represented as a rolled out cylinder where the width equals the circumference and the height equals the stroke plus the cylinder skirt, the ports are outlined.

See also 
Kramer graph

Two-stroke engine technology
Engine technology
Internal combustion piston engines
Motorcycle engines
Visualization (graphics)